The Discovery Investigations were a series of scientific cruises and shore-based investigations into the biology of whales in the Southern Ocean. They were funded by the British Colonial Office and organised by the Discovery Committee in London, which was formed in 1918. They were intended to provide the scientific background to stock management of the commercial Antarctic whale fishery.
The work of the Investigations contributed hugely to our knowledge of the whales, the krill they fed on, and the oceanography of their habitat, while charting the local topography, including Atherton Peak. The investigations continued until 1951, with the final report being published in 1980.

Specimens collected during the cruises are collectively known as the Discovery Collections.

Laboratory 
Shore-based work on South Georgia took place in the marine laboratory, Discovery House, built in 1925 at King Edward Point and occupied until 1931. The scientists lived and worked in the building, travelling half a mile or so across King Edward Cove to the whaling station at Grytviken to work on whales as they were brought ashore by commercial whaling ships.

Ships 
Vessels used were:
RRS Discovery from 1924 to 1931
RRS William Scoresby from 1927 to 1945 or later
RRS Discovery II from 1929 to 1951

Reports 
Results of the investigations were printed in the Discovery Reports. This was a series of many small reports, published in 38 volumes by the Cambridge University Press, and latterly the Institute of Oceanographic Sciences. Many were printed as individual reports rather than in large volumes.

List of the Discovery Reports

Books 
The Discovery Investigations are described in the following books, all of which were out of print in 2008:

References

External links 
 Scanned copies of many of the reports are available at the Biodiversity Heritage Library.

History of South Georgia and the South Sandwich Islands
History of Earth science
Biological oceanography
Antarctic expeditions
1918 establishments in the United Kingdom
Defunct organisations based in London